The Leinster Leader Junior Club Cup is a Gaelic football competition for junior clubs organised by the Kildare GAA. Founded in 1995, it is sponsored by the Leinster Leader and it has gained mild support at county level.

List of winners
 1995 - Rheban (Rheban 2-16 to Cappagh's 1-14)
 1996 - Kildangan (Kildangan 1-10 to Cappagh's 0-11)
 1997 - Cappagh (Cappagh 4-21 to Milltown's 0-08)
 1998 - Rheban (Rheban 2-09 to Ardclough's 2-05)
 1999 - Milltown (Milltown 1-13 to Kildangan's 0-12)
 2000 - Two Mile House (Two Mile House 2-15 to Ardclough's 3-09)
 2001 - Kildangan (Kildangan 3-17 to Cappagh's 2-11)
 2002 - Rheban (Rheban 1-14 to Straffan's 0-15)
 2003 - Ardclough (Ardclough 3-18 to Milltown's 2-16)
 2004 - Straffan (Straffan 0-18 to Two Mile House's 2-10)
 2005 - Milltown (Milltown 1-16 to Cappagh's 2-09)
 2006 - Cappagh (Cappagh 0-19 to Milltown's 0-18)
 2007 - Rheban (Rheban 3-18 to Athgarvan's 1-08)
 2008 - Straffan (Straffan 2-17 to Rheban's 2-10)

Teams
Rheban have the best record in the Cup, winning it on 4 occasions (1995, 1998, 2002 and 2007) and being finalists on one other occasion (2008). Other excelled teams are as follows:
 Cappagh ( 1997 and 2006 ) - losing finalist (1995, 1996, 2001 and 2005)
 Milltown (1999 and 2005) - losing finalist (1997, 2003 and 2006)

1995 establishments in Ireland
Gaelic football competitions in County Kildare
Recurring sporting events established in 1995